The discography of Robert Palmer consists of 14 studio albums, three live albums and 12 compilation albums. For the discographies of Vinegar Joe and the Power Station (groups Palmer had been a member of), see their respective pages.

Albums

Studio albums

Live albums

Compilation albums

Box sets

Singles

Notes

References

Discographies of British artists
Discography